The Padmavati Express, (No. 12763/12764), is a superfast express train belonging to Indian Railways, connecting Secundrabad to Tirupati. The train belongs to the South Central Railway. It runs daily, via Warangal, Vijayawada, Gudur.

Background
It is named after goddess Padmavati. The train departs from Secunderabad at 18:30 hours and arrives in Tirupati at 07:00 hours the next day. From Tirupati, the train departs at 17:00 hours and arrives in Secunderabad at 05:50 hours the next day.

Route
Major stations on the route include Kazipet, Warangal, Khammam, Vijayawada, Tenali, Ongole, Nellore, Gudur, Srikalahasthi and Renigunta.

Loco links
It gets a WAP 7 locomotive of Lallaguda electric loco shed from Secundrabad to Tirupati.

Classes
The train usually has a, 1 AC 2-Tier Coach, 3 AC 3-Tier Coaches, 13 Sleeper Class Coaches, and 3 General Compartments and 2SLR's. A rake of the Padmavati Express consists of 21 Coaches. It has rake sharing with Secundrabad-Tirupati (12731/12732) Express

See also
Visakhapatnam Swarna Jayanti Express
Narayanadri Express
Venkatadri Express

References

Transport in Tirupati
Transport in Secunderabad
Railway services introduced in 2011
Named passenger trains of India
Express trains in India
Rail transport in Andhra Pradesh
Rail transport in Telangana
Rail transport in Karnataka